John (Jack) S. Bowen (born c. 1927) is an American advertising executive and Advertising Hall of Fame inductee. He was CEO of D'Arcy Masius Benton & Bowles.

He oversaw the merger of Benton & Bowles and D'Arcy MacManus Masius, then ushered in their drive toward globalization. He was inducted into the hall of fame following his retirement.

References

External links
John S. Bowen via AAF Hall of Fame

1920s births
Living people
Advertising directors
20th-century American businesspeople